The Adventures of Frank Race was an American radio adventure serial syndicated by Bruce Eells Productions. The 30-minute program's first East Coast broadcast was 1949, and the show ran 43 episodes. Because it was syndicated, it aired on different stations on different days. For instance, in New York City, the first episode ran on WINS on April 9, 1949.  It "began running in some markets May 1, 1949. The series was broadcast on the West Coast from 1951–52. 

Each episode opened with a one-minute organ theme and then the following from announcer Art Gilmore:
The war changed many things; the face of the earth and the people on it. Before the war, Frank Race worked as an attorney, but he traded his law books for the cloak-and-dagger of the OSS. And when it was over, his former life was over, too... adventure had become his business!

Characters and story
Frank Race mainly investigated international insurance scams around the globe in various exotic locations, making him something of a cross between James Bond and Johnny Dollar. After Tom Collins played the title role for the first 22 episodes, Paul Dubov took over the lead role. Tony Barrett portrayed Race's sidekick, Mark Donovan. Other actors included  Jack Kruschen, Wilms Herbert, Lillian Buyeff, Frank Lovejoy and Harry Lang.

The series was written and directed by Joel Murcott and Buckley Angel. Ivan Ditmars provided the background organ music.

Episodes
East Coast premiere broadcasts

References

Listen to

Radio Detective Story Hour: The Adventures of Frank Race
 OTR Net Library, all 43 episodes of The Adventures of Frank Race
Zoot Radio, Free downloads of The Adventures of Frank Race radio show

Adventures of Frank Race, The
Adventures of Frank Race, The